Banning is a 1967 American Technicolor drama film directed by Ron Winston and starring Robert Wagner, Jill St. John, Gene Hackman, Guy Stockwell and James Farentino.

Plot
Mike McDermot is a rising golf star on the PGA Tour until he is accused of cheating.  He supposedly has offered to split a winner's purse with a competitor, Jonathan Linus, if his opponent deliberately misses a final putt. In fact, the competitor is the one who approached him.  McDermot refuses, so Jonathan Linus goes to another pro, Tommy Del Gaddo, whose glory days were behind him. Then they turn in McDermot, accusing him of their crime.

Linus retires from the PGA Tour and marries into a rich family.  His wife is the daughter of a wealthy businessman in Arizona; through their money, they are now principals (President and General Manager) of an exclusive golf club, the El Presidente. Del Gaddo becomes the head pro at the club as reward for supporting Linus in winning the Eastern Open.

McDermot, now calling himself Mike Banning, arrives and threatens to expose them, so he is given the assistant pro's job to quiet him.  Banning proceeds to lure the club's high rollers to stage a high-wager golf tournament, a Calcutta, in which two-man teams are auctioned off. All money is then put in a pot and split three ways between the teammates and their bidder.

Banning must win this tournament to make enough money, $21,000, to pay off the mob, which had bankrolled his trial on the PGA Tour.  He is literally playing for his life (and that of his dentist who actually took out the loan).

Banning knows the President cheats; he plays high-stakes poker, appearing drunk on whiskey while actually drinking iced tea.  Another local aristocrat, Angela Barr, wins the highly competitive bidding for Banning's team over the President's daughter.  The president knew of Banning's background and had his daughter bid for him for what he was sure would be the winning team.

Before play proceeds, Chris Patton tells the organizing committee that Banning is a former pro. Banning ends up giving up his handicap of 5 to play at scratch.  He is informed that Patton provided this information and gets into a fight with him, almost killing him.  Patton withdraws from the tournament and is replaced by Linus, now playing with his father-in-law, J. Pallister Young.

The tournament comes down to a sudden-death playoff, just as had happened in the ill-fated attempt to bribe Banning on the tour.  On the 17th hole, with a life-saving shot, Banning makes a near impossible shot over a tall stand of trees.

Cast
 Robert Wagner as Mike Banning
 Anjanette Comer as Carol Lindquist
 Jill St. John as Angela Barr
 Guy Stockwell as Jonathan Linus
 James Farentino as Chris Patton
 Susan Clark as Cynthia Linus
 Howard St. John as J. Pallister Young
 Mike Kellin as Harry Kalielle
 Gene Hackman as Tommy Del Gaddo
 Sean Garrison as Richard Tyson
 Logan Ramsey as Doc Brewer
 Edmon Ryan as Stuart Warren
 Oliver McGowan as Senator Brady
 Lucille Meredith as Maggi Andrews 
 William Cort as Tony (as Bill Cort)

Reception 
Howard Thompson of The New York Times called it "unusual, but noticeably unimpressive".

See also
List of American films of 1967

References

External links 
 
 

1967 films
1960s sports drama films
American sports drama films
1960s English-language films
Golf films
Films set in Arizona
Universal Pictures films
Films scored by Quincy Jones
1967 drama films
Films directed by Ron Winston
1960s American films